Hyalobathra undulinea is a moth in the family Crambidae. It was described by George Hampson in 1891. It is found in India (Nilgiri) and Taiwan.

References

Moths described in 1891
Pyraustinae